Randall Emmett (born March 25, 1971) is an American film producer and television personality. He is the chairman and co-founder of production company Emmett/Furla Oasis Films.

Emmett is best known as the producer of the films 2 Guns, Silence, Lone Survivor and The Irishman. He appeared in eighth and ninth seasons of the Bravo reality television series Vanderpump Rules.

Early life and education
Emmett was born to a Jewish family in Miami, Florida, according to Emmett, a "distant cousin", through his mother, of Jerry Bruckheimer, and received a Bachelor of Fine Arts degree from the School of Visual Arts in New York City.

Career
In 1995, Emmett began his Hollywood career as a personal assistant to Mark Wahlberg. Later he met George Furla, with whom he co-founded Emmett/Furla Films in 1998. In 2013, the company was joined by Dubai-based film financier Oasis Ventures Entertainment to become Emmet/Furla Oasis Films (EFO).

On June 29, 2022, the LA Times released an article accusing Emmett of offering women movie roles in exchange for sex. The article also claimed that Emmett paid a woman a $200,000 settlement for inappropriate contact, and knocked his ex-fiance to the ground after she attempted to grab his phone.

Poker 
Emmett has been playing poker since 2012. He has won four tournaments which include two victories in $10,000 buy-in high roller tournaments at Aria Resort and Casino. He has one World Series of Poker cash in 2019 and two cashes on the World Poker Tour. As of February 2021, his live tournament winnings exceed $590,000.

Emmett has made regular TV poker appearances on PokerGO shows including World Series of Poker coverage, Poker After Dark, and Friday Night Poker.

Personal life 
In 2009, Emmett married actress Ambyr Childers, with whom he has two daughters. Emmett filed for separation from Childers in April 2015, but dismissed the petition the following year. Childers filed for divorce in January 2017. It was finalized in December 2017.

Emmett was engaged to Lauren "Lala Kent" Burningham from Vanderpump Rules. On March 15, 2021, their daughter was born. The couple split in November 2021.

Filmography

Producer

Executive producer

Director
 Midnight in the Switchgrass (2021)
 Wash Me in the River (2022)
 Cash Out (TBA)

Special thanks
 Out of Death (2021)
 3 Days Rising (TBA)

References

External links 
 

1971 births
Living people
American film producers
20th-century American Jews
21st-century American Jews